The 2016 São Paulo municipal election took place in the city of São Paulo on the 2 October 2016. Voters voted to elect the Mayor, the Vice Mayor and 55 City Councillors for the administration of the city. The result was a 1st round victory for João Doria of the Brazilian Social Democratic Party (PSDB), winning 3,085,187 votes and a share of 53,28% of the popular vote, defeating incumbent mayor Fernando Haddad of the Workers' Party (PT), who took 967,190 votes and a share of 16,70% of the popular vote. Although Haddad came in second place on the popular vote, he did not win any electoral zone, while Marta Suplicy (PMDB), who came in fourth place, managed to win a plurality of the votes in 2 electoral zones.

Background 
The campaign happened in the context of the ongoing political crisis and the fallout after the recently impeached president Dilma Rousseff, of the Workers' Party (PT). This event played a huge role in the election, which would see a weakened Worker's Party (PT). The election saw the resurgence of the Brazilian Social Democratic Party (PSDB) with Doria emerging as their leading candidate in opposition to the Worker's Party, which was suffering a steady decline following Dilma's impeachment.

Incumbent mayor Fernando Haddad ran a reelection campaign on keeping the left-wing status-quo, in contrast to Doria's campaign, which emphasized mostly socially liberal economic reforms, as part of the "liberal wave" following the fallout of Dilma's impeachment. Among other candidates were Celso Russomano (PRB), Marta Suplicy (PMDB), Altino Prazeres (PSTU), Ricardo Young (REDE), João Bico (PSDC), Levy Fidelix (PRTB), Luiza Erundina (PSOL) and Major Olímpio (SD).

Candidates

Debates

Opinion polls

Results

Mayor

Municipal Chamber

References

2016
2016 elections in Brazil
October 2016 events in South America